Dueña y señora ("Owner and Lady") is a 1948 Mexican film. It stars Sara García.

External links
 

1948 films
1940s Spanish-language films
Mexican black-and-white films
Mexican drama films
1948 drama films
1940s Mexican films